Avernas-le-Bauduin Airfield  is a club aerodrome located near Hannut, Liège, Wallonia, Belgium. It only serves ULM planes, many of which are based there.

See also
List of airports in Belgium

References

External links 
 
 Airport record for Avernas-le-Bauduin Airport at Landings.com

Airports in Liège Province
Hannut